Joy Udo-Gabriel (born 2 June 1999) is a Nigerian sprinter. She won a bronze medal in the 100 metres at the 2018 African Championships, a bronze medal in the 4 × 100 metres relay at the 2018 Commonwealth Games as well as a gold medal in the 4 x 100 metres relay at the 2019 African Games.

Competition record

Personal bests
100 metres – 11.34(+0.3 m/s,yaba tech MOC Grand Prix 2021)
200 metres – 23.92 (-0.8 m/s, yabatech MOC Grand Prix 2021)

References

1999 births
Living people
Nigerian female sprinters
Commonwealth Games bronze medallists for Nigeria
Athletes (track and field) at the 2018 Commonwealth Games
Sportspeople from Abia State
Commonwealth Games medallists in athletics
Athletes (track and field) at the 2019 African Games
African Games gold medalists for Nigeria
African Games medalists in athletics (track and field)
21st-century Nigerian women
Medallists at the 2018 Commonwealth Games